Parliamentary elections were held in Colombia on 9 March 1986 to elect the Senate and Chamber of Representatives. The Liberal Party remained the largest party, but lost its majority in the Chamber.

Campaign
The Patriotic Union made alliances with several of the small parties at the regional and constituency level for the elections, including the Communist Party, some Liberal Party and New Liberalism members, and the National Popular Alliance.

Results

Senate

Chamber of Representatives

References

Parliamentary elections in Colombia
Colombia
1986 in Colombia
Election and referendum articles with incomplete results